Friedrich Wachowiak (13 February 1920 – 16 July 1944) was a former German Luftwaffe fighter ace and recipient of the Knight's Cross of the Iron Cross during World War II. Wachowiak served with Jagdgeschwader 52 (JG 52—52nd Fighter Wing) and Jagdgeschwader 3 "Udet" (JG 3—3rd Fighter Wing). In 1943 and early 1944, he served as a fighter pilot instructor and came back to the front in May 1944. On 16 July 1944, he was killed in action fighting against the western Allies over Normandy.

Career
Wachowiak was born on 13 February 1920 in Somborn, present-day part of Dortmund, at the time in the Province of Westphalia of the Weimar Republic. Trained as fighter pilot, Wachowiak was posted to 8. Staffel (8th squadron) of Jagdgeschwader 52 (JG 52—52nd Fighter Wing) on 29 July 1940 holding the rank of Obergefreiter. At the time, 8. Staffel was commanded by Oberleutnant Günther Rall. The Staffel was subordinated to III. Gruppe (3rd group) of JG 52 temporarily headed by Hauptmann Wilhelm Ensslin after its former commander Major Wolf-Heinrich von Houwald was killed in action on 24 July.

The rise of General Ion Antonescu in Romania in 1940 led to a reorganization of his country's armed forces. In this, he was supported by a military mission from Germany, the Luftwaffenmission Rumänien (Luftwaffe Mission Romania) under the command of Generalleutnant (equivalent to major general) Wilhelm Speidel. III. Gruppe of JG 52 was transferred to Bucharest in mid-October and temporarily renamed I. Gruppe of Jagdgeschwader 28 (JG 28—28th Fighter Wing) until 4 January 1941. Its primary task was to train Romanian Air Force personnel. The Gruppe was placed under the command of Major Gotthard Handrick who had previously served on the staff of Luftwaffenmission Rumänien. 8. Staffel arrived at Pipera Airfield on 15 October where they stayed until 18 November when they moved to Leipzig-Mockau Airfield. Three days later, 8. Staffel moved to Parndorf in Austria. On 30 November, the Staffel began relocating back to Pipera Airfield where they arrived on 2 December, staying there until 27 May 1941.

War against the Soviet Union
On 21 June 1941, III. Gruppe was ordered to Mizil in preparation of Operation Barbarossa, the German invasion of the Soviet Union. Its primary objective was to provide fighter protection for the oil fields and refineries at Ploiești. The invasion of the Soviet Union began on 22 June. The next day, the Gruppe moved to Mamaia, the northern district of Constanța on the Black Sea coast. There, Wachowiak claimed his first two aerial victories on 24 June. He was credited with shooting down two Soviet Ilyushin DB-3 bombers in the morning near Constanța. Two days later, he claimed another DB-3 bomber in the same combat area.

The Gruppe moved to Belaya Tserkov on 1 August and also used an airfield at Yampil from 6 to 8 August. There, Wachowiak claimed two Polikarpov I-16 fighter on 4 August near Kiev. Five days later, he was credited with a Tupolev SB-2 bomber. On 17 August, Wachowiak shot down a Polikarpov I-15 fighter. On 27 August, III.

Wachowiak was awarded the Knight's Cross of the Iron Cross 5 April 1942 following his 46th aerial victory.

Instructor, Western Front and death

In 1943 and early 1944, Wachowiak served as a fighter pilot instructor. While serving with II. Gruppe of Ergänzungs-Jagdgeschwader 1 (EJG 1—1st Supplementary Fighter Wing), a Luftwaffe replacement training unit, he trained Croatian fighter pilots of the Croatian Air Force Legion at Saint-Jean-d'Angély. Some of these pilots later served with 15. Staffel of JG 52.

In May 1944, Wachowiak was posted to 7. Staffel of JG 52. At the time, III. Gruppe was based at Cape Chersonez located at the Sevastopol Bay. He claimed first aerial victory following his tour as a fighter pilot instructor on 6 May over an Ilyushin Il-2 ground-attack aircraft. The following day, he was credited with the destruction of a Yakovlev Yak-9 fighter. The Gruppe then relocated a few times before moving to an airfield at Roman on 18 May. There, Wachowiak claimed his last documented aerial victory when he shot down a Petlyakov Pe-2 bomber on 29 May.

The Staffel, under the commanded by Oberleutnant Eberhard Fischler Graf von Treuberg, was withdrawn from the Eastern Front and transferred west to fight in Defense of the Reich. The Staffel was subordinated to III. Gruppe of Jagdgeschwader 3 "Udet" (JG 3—3rd Fighter Wing) led by Major Karl-Heinz Langer. There, the Staffel was later redesignated and became the 12. Staffel of JG 3. The transfer order had been issued on 29 May. The pilots and ground staff were taken by train to Salzwedel. The Staffel was then ordered to Chartres Airfield.

Wachowiak was killed in action on 16 July 1944 on the Normandy invasion front. He was among the first pilots killed following the relocation to the Western Front. Of the original sixteen pilots transferred, only two pilots survived the war. Wachowiak was shot down in his Messerschmitt Bf 109 G-6 (Werknummer 165507—factory number) during aerial combat with a Supermarine Spitfire near Écouché. According to Mathews and Foreman, Wachowiak may have been shot down by Spitfire fighters from the Royal Canadian Air Force (RCAF) No. 403 Squadron.

Summary of career

Aerial victory claims
According to US historian David T. Zabecki, Wachowiak was credited with 140 aerial victories. Schreier lists him with 130 aerial victories. According to Obermaier, the exact number of aerial victories Wachowiak was credited with is not exactly known. Obermaier states that he claimed at least 86 aerial victories on the Eastern Front. His mother testified that he had claimed approximately 120 aerial victories, while his comrades claim that he shot down about 140 aircraft. Spick also states that Wachowiak was credited with at least 86 aerial victories, all of which claimed over the Eastern Front in an unknown number of combat missions. According to Rall, who was Wachowiak's commanding officer and regular wingman, Wachowiak had approximately 100 aerial victories by August 1942. Mathews and Foreman, authors of Luftwaffe Aces — Biographies and Victory Claims, researched the German Federal Archives and found records for 89 aerial victories, all of which claimed on the Eastern Front.

Victory claims were logged to a map-reference (PQ = Planquadrat), for example "PQ 44423". These sectors were then subdivided into 36 smaller units to give a location area 3 × 4 km in size.

Awards
 Iron Cross (1939) 2nd and 1st Class
 Front Flying Clasp of the Luftwaffe in Gold
 Honor Goblet of the Luftwaffe on 15 December 1941 as Unteroffizier and pilot
 German Cross in Gold on 22 January 1942 as Unteroffizier in the III./Jagdgeschwader 52
 Knight's Cross of the Iron Cross on 5 April 1942 as Unteroffizier and pilot in the III./Jagdgeschwader 52

Notes

References

Citations

Bibliography

External links
TracesOfWar.com

1920 births
1944 deaths
Military personnel from Dortmund
German World War II flying aces
Recipients of the Gold German Cross
Recipients of the Knight's Cross of the Iron Cross
People from the Province of Westphalia
Luftwaffe personnel killed in World War II
Aviators killed by being shot down
Burials at Champigny-Saint-André German war cemetery